Hans Kraay Jr. (born 22 December 1959) is a Dutch former professional footballer turned coach and television presenter.

Biography
Kraay Jr. was born in Utrecht on 22 December 1959, the son of fellow footballer Hans Kraay Sr.

Career
Kraay played professionally in the Netherlands for AZ, SBV Excelsior, HFC Haarlem, NAC Breda, RKC Waalwijk, Helmond Sport, FC Eindhoven, De Graafschap, FC Dordrecht, Telstar and FC Den Bosch, in the North American Soccer League for the Edmonton Drillers, Edmonton Eagles and the San Jose Earthquakes, in England for Brighton & Hove Albion, and in Belgium for Sint-Niklase.

He also served as head coach of Dutch amateurs FC Lienden from 2004 to 2011, leading the club from Tweede Klasse to Topklasse and making it nationally known within Dutch football.

In November 2011 he was appointed head coach of Topklasse club SVZW. One month later, it was revealed his appointment head coach of JVC Cuijk, effective from July 2012. He left after two seasons in charge to become new head coach of Hoofdklasse club DOVO, effective from July 2014.

Kraay presented numerous television shows on Dutch television, most notably for SBS 6, for which he worked from 1997 till 2015. Between 2002 and 2015 he was the presenter of Lachen om Home Video's, on SBS 6, a compilation program of funny home videos. A part of the videos were taken from America's Funniest Home Videos. In 2003 he had a hit record in The Netherlands reaching #3 at the Dutch Top 40 with Er zal d'r altijd eentje winnen, a song recorded with fans of various Dutch football clubs as a reaction to the violent meeting at Beverwijk of hooligans of AFC Ajax and Feyenoord, leading to the death of one hooligan.

In April 2018, Kraay handed in his resignation at FC Lienden due to a discourtesy by supporters of the FC Lienden business club.

References

1959 births
Living people
Dutch footballers
Dutch expatriate footballers
Dutch football managers
Dutch association football commentators
Dutch television presenters
Brighton & Hove Albion F.C. players
English Football League players
North American Soccer League (1968–1984) players
San Jose Earthquakes (1974–1988) players
Edmonton Drillers (1979–1982) players
Footballers from Utrecht (city)
AZ Alkmaar players
Excelsior Rotterdam players
HFC Haarlem players
NAC Breda players
RKC Waalwijk players
Helmond Sport players
FC Eindhoven players
De Graafschap players
FC Dordrecht players
FC Den Bosch players
Eredivisie players
Eerste Divisie players
Expatriate soccer players in Canada
Dutch expatriate sportspeople in Canada
Expatriate soccer players in the United States
Dutch expatriate sportspeople in the United States
VV DOVO managers
FC Lienden managers
K. Sint-Niklase S.K.E. players
Association football defenders
Edmonton Eagles players
Canadian Professional Soccer League (original) players